Robert Parsons may refer to:

Sports
 Robert Andrew Parsons or Drew Parsons (born 1975), Scottish cricketer
 Bob Parsons (American football) (1950–2022), American football player
 Bob Parsons (Australian footballer) (1941–2015), Australian rules footballer for Footscray
 Bob Parsons (basketball) (1915–1985), American basketball player

Others
 Robert Parsons (composer) (c. 1535–1572), English composer
 Robert Parsons (Jesuit) (1546–1610), English priest
 Robert E. Parsons (1892–1966), American politician
 Robert John Parsons (died 1883), journalist and politician in Newfoundland
 Bob Parsons (born 1950), American entrepreneur